Khun Tan may refer to:
 
Khun Tan Range 
Doi Khun Tan National Park
Khun Tan Tunnel, the longest railway tunnel in Thailand in Lampang and Lamphun provinces
Khun Tan Station, the highest railway station in Thailand
, after  "Tan" (ตาล), the Borassus flabellifer palm tree
Khun Tan District in Chiang Rai province
Khun Tan River, Chiang Rai province